Amulek is a key figure in the Book of Alma, a book of the Book of Mormon.

Mission to Ammonihah
According to Alma, chapters 8-14, Amulek, in 82 B.C., accompanied the prophet Alma the Younger on a mission to the wicked city of Ammonihah, where he preached the Gospel and contended with the smooth-talking lawyer (and future convert) Zeezrom.  There, he witnessed righteous women and children being burned alive along with their scriptures.  Amulek pleaded unsuccessfully for Alma to use Divine power to save the victims from the flames; Alma assured his companion that the innocent would be received by God and that the wicked would face their judgment "at the last day."  Amulek and Alma were later bound and imprisoned, but broke from their bonds through the power of faith, causing the prison walls to crumble, slaying their captors.

Preaching to the Zoramites
On a later mission to the Zoramites, Amulek delivered a sermon on prayer and the urgency of repentance.

Other mentions
In the Book of Ether, the author recalls "the faith of Alma and Amulek that caused the prison to tumble to the earth."

References

External links
Guide to the Scriptures: Amulek, from The Official Scriptures of the Church of Jesus Christ of Latter-day Saints
The Book of Alma online

Book of Mormon people